Siebenaler is a village in the commune of Clervaux, in northern Luxembourg.  , the village has a population of 56.

References

Clervaux
Villages in Luxembourg